The following is a list of notable events and releases that happened, or were expected to happen in 2020 in music in South Korea.

Debuting and disbanding in 2020

Debuting groups

 Aespa
 BAE173
 Blackswan
 B.O.Y
 Botopass
 BtoB 4U
 Cignature
 Cravity
 DKB
 Drippin
 E'Last
 Enhypen
 Ghost9
 H&D
 Lucy
 Lunarsolar
 MCND
 P1Harmony
 Redsquare
 Red Velvet - Irene & Seulgi
 Refund Sisters
 Secret Number
 SSAK3
 STAYC
 TO1
 Treasure
 UNVS
 Weeekly
 WEi
 Woo!ah!
 WJSN Chocome

Solo debuts

 Bang Ye-dam
 Han Seung-woo
D.Ark
 Heo Chan-mi
 Kai
 Ken
 Kim Nam-joo
 Kim Woo-seok
 Lee Eun-sang
 Lee Su-hyun
 Max
 Moon Jong-up
 Natty
 Ong Seong-wu
 Ryu Su-jeong
 Seo Eun-kwang
 Serri
 Solar
 Suho
 Wonho
 YooA
 Yook Sung-jae
 Yoon Doo-joon

Disbandments

 1the9
 5urprise
 A Train To Autumn
 Badkiz
 Gugudan
 H&D
 Hinapia
 Masc
 NeonPunch
 Purple Rain
 Spectrum
 SSAK3
 X1

Releases in 2020

First quarter

January

February

March

Second quarter

April

May

June

Third quarter

July

August

September

Fourth quarter

October

November

December

See also
List of South Korean films of 2020
List of Gaon Album Chart number ones of 2020
List of Gaon Digital Chart number ones of 2020

Notes

References

 
South Korean music
K-pop